The Chamangá Rock Art Place is a concentration of rock painting located at Chamangá to the east of Trinidad, Uruguay.

See also 
 Chamangá

References

External links 

Flores Department
Historic preservation in Uruguay
Rock art in South America
Archaeological sites in Uruguay
Protected areas of Uruguay
Pre-Columbian archaeology
Indigenous painting of the Americas
Indigenous culture of the Southern Cone